Safir may refer to:

SAFIR, the Single Aperture Far-Infrared Observatory
Safir (Arthurian legend), a Saracen Knight of the Round Table in the Arthurian legend
Safir (Belgian beer), a Belgian beer now owned by InBev
Safir (cycling team), a Belgian professional cycling team known as Safir 1978 and 1985
Safir (models), a French toy company specializing in 1:43 scale cars and trucks.
Safir (rocket) an Iranian rocket
Safir (singer) Danish singer and songwriter
Safir (vehicle), an Iranian made military jeep
Safir Engineering, a racecar engineering firm
Saab 91 Safir, a single-engine trainer aircraft

See also
Saafir
Sapphire (disambiguation)
Shapiro
Zafir (disambiguation)